Ferroviario Atlético Clube, commonly known as Ferroviário, was a Brazilian football club based in Porto Velho, Rondônia state. They were the most successful team in the Campeonato Rondoniense.

History
The club was founded on July 10, 1943 by employees of Madeira-Mamoré Railroad. Ferroviário won the Campeonato Rondoniense in 1946, 1947, 1948, 1949, 1950, 1951, 1952, 1955, 1957, 1958, 1963, 1970, 1978, 1979, 1986, 1987, and in 1989.

Achievements

 Campeonato Rondoniense:
 Winners (17): 1946, 1947, 1948, 1949, 1950, 1951, 1952, 1955, 1957, 1958, 1963, 1970, 1978, 1979, 1986, 1987, 1989

Stadium

Ferroviário Atlético Clube played their home games at Estádio Aluízio Ferreira. The stadium has a maximum capacity of 7,000 people.

References

Association football clubs established in 1943
Association football clubs disestablished in 1990
Defunct football clubs in Rondônia
1943 establishments in Brazil
1990 disestablishments in Brazil